Xenoxybelis is a genus of colubrid snakes endemic to South America.

Species
There are 2 recognized species.

Xenoxybelis argenteus  – NW South America
Xenoxybelis boulengeri  – Bolivia, Peru, Brazil

Nota bene: A binomial authority in parentheses indicates that the species was originally described in a genus other than Xenoxybelis.

References

Colubrids
Snake genera